The Colorado Springs and Interurban Railway (CS & IRR, CS&IR) was an electric trolley system in the Colorado Springs, Colorado that operated from 1902 to 1932. The company was formed when Winfield Scott Stratton purchased Colorado Springs Rapid Transit Railway in 1901 and consolidated it in 1902 with the Colorado Springs & Suburban Railway Company. It operated in Colorado Springs, its suburbs, and Manitou Springs. One of the street cars from Stratton's first order is listed on the Colorado State Register of Historic Properties.

Background
The Colorado Springs and Manitou Street Railway began horsecar trolley service in 1887. It ran between the Colorado Springs business district and Colorado College. The following year the route extended north and west with a total of ten horse-drawn trolleys.  The Colorado Springs Rapid Transit Railway, chartered in 1890, bought the system and established the first electric trolley line to Manitou Springs in October 1890, as they transitioned from horse-drawn to electric trolleys. In 1898, trolleys ran west to Colorado City, east to Knob Hill, to Cheyenne Park,   and connected with the Atchison, Topeka and Santa Fe Passenger Depot. With the additional destinations, there were 44 electric trolleys in 1900.

Interurban railway company

The Colorado Springs & Interurban Railway Company was created after Winfield Scott Stratton bought the Colorado Springs Rapid Transit Railway in 1901 and consolidated it with the Colorado Springs & Suburban Railway Company in September 1902. Service ran to a trolley park beyond Boulevard Park in 1903. The north/south main line provided service from a loop at the town of Roswell

Colorado Springs and Interurban Railway ridership peaked in 1911 and within three years it began to suffer financially as automobile ownership increased. By 1916, its offices were located at 530 South Tejon. At that time there were separate cars that ran from the Main Post Office and Federal Courthouse to the Printer's Home. The east/west mainline extended from Manitou's Iron Springs neighborhood eastward through Garden of the Gods Balanced Rock Station in 1916. In 1916, the system had a power house building at 205 Rio Grande West.

Over the years, service ran east to the North Colorado Springs suburb and southward from the ATSF/Rock Island railroad bridge through the city to the Ivywild and Broadmoor suburbs, where the Cheyenne Mountain Country Club was along the Cheyenne Canon street car line and the terminus It also ran to Broadmoor Park and adjacent to Stratton Park at the entrances to the North and South Cheyenne Cañons. A north/south branch line on Spruce and Walnut streets extended from Yampa street southward to Huerfano Street.

Buses began replacing the system's railcars in 1931 and the last electric tram ran on April 30, 1932. In the mid 1930s, the Works Progress Administration removed most of the street car rails. The Colorado Springs & Interurban power house site at the northwest corner of S Sierra Madre and Las Animas streets remains an electrical power station (now of Colorado Springs Utilities).

Historic property
Winfield Scott Stratton ordered streetcars for the Colorado Springs & Suburban Railway in 1901. It was the first set of cars purchased by Stratton and they were outfitted with safety features, like the retractable Narragansett steps, retractable windows that could be adjusted in transit, and had separate non-smoking and smoking sections. It was a step in the transition from wood to steel framed cars and used the Brill convertible design. Colorado Springs & Interurban Railway (CS&IR) Streetcar No. 59, the only remaining streetcar from that order, is listed on the Colorado State Register of Historic Properties.

See also
 Manitou and Pike's Peak Railway
 Cripple Creek Mining District, for the Low Line/High Line
 Seven Lakes–Pike's Peak Railway Company

Notes

References

Further reading

External links
  Colorado Springs Interurban Railway -- an organization that collects, preserves and displays history of the historic street car system

1902 establishments in Colorado
Defunct Colorado railroads
History of El Paso County, Colorado
Light rail in Colorado
Transportation in El Paso County, Colorado
Railway companies established in 1902
American companies established in 1902